Threnody is the third album by American death metal band Woe of Tyrants, released on April 13, 2010 through Metal Blade Records. It was produced by Jamie King.

Track listing
 "Tetelestai"                                   – 1:06
 "Creatures of the Mire"                        – 4:57
 "Venom Eye"                                    - 4:56
 "Tempting the Wretch"                          - 4:28
 "Threnody"                                     - 4:30
 "Bloodsmear"                                   - 5:40
 "The Venus Orbit"                              - 5:56
 "Lightning Over Atlantis"                      - 5:20
 "Singing Surrender"                            - 4:39
 "Descendit Ad Inferos (The Harrowing of Hell)" - 7:39

Personnel
Chris Catanzaro - vocals
Nick Dozer - guitar
Matt Kincaid - guitar
Shaun Gunter - bass
Johnny Roberts - drums
Dustie Waring (Between the Buried and Me) - solo on "Venom Eye"

References

2010 albums
Woe of Tyrants albums
Metal Blade Records albums